Ghirolt may refer to several villages in Romania:

 Ghirolt, a village in Aluniş Commune, Cluj County
 Ghirolt, a village in Moftin Commune, Satu Mare County